Thomas William Kozelko (born July 1, 1951) is a retired American basketball player who played briefly in the National Basketball Association (NBA).

Kozelko starred at Traverse City Central High School in Traverse City, Michigan and moved on to play collegiately at the University of Toledo from 1970 to 1973.  Kozelko went on to become one of the best players in Rocket history, as he finished 1,561 points in his three-year career (freshmen were ineligible).  He was the first player in Mid-American Conference history to be named MAC player of the year twice, in 1972 and 1973.  He was named to the University of Toledo athletic Hall of Fame in 1983.

After completing his eligibility, Kozelko was drafted by the Capital Bullets in the third round (48th pick overall) of the 1973 NBA draft. He played three seasons for the Bullets (who later renamed themselves the Washington Bullets), averaging 10.1 minutes and 2.2 points per game.

References

External links
NBA statistics

1951 births
Living people
American expatriate basketball people in Italy
American men's basketball players
Basketball players from Michigan
Capital Bullets draft picks
Capital Bullets players
Power forwards (basketball)
Sportspeople from Traverse City, Michigan
Toledo Rockets men's basketball players
Washington Bullets players